Chris Appel is a retired American basketball player.  He is known for his All-American college career at the University of Southern California.

Appel came to USC from Hollywood High School in Hollywood, Los Angeles.  He came into his own in his sophomore year, averaging 13.4 points per game, lifting the Trojans into the 1961 NCAA tournament, and joining teammate John Rudometkin as a unanimous first-team all-conference choice.  As a senior, Appel repeated on the all-conference team and was named a second-team All-American by the Sporting News magazine.

After completing his college career, Appel was drafted by the Cincinnati Royals in the third round of the 1962 NBA draft (24th pick overall).  He elected not to pursue a career in professional basketball and instead became a teacher and school administrator and spent decades conducting basketball clinics in Asia, Africa and all over the world.  Appel began this work due to both his basketball skill and background and his ability to speak French, learned from his Russian and French parents.  His first assignments were in French-speaking Cambodia.

References

External links
College stats @ the Draft Review

Living people
All-American college men's basketball players
American men's basketball players
American people of French descent
American people of Russian descent
Basketball players from Los Angeles
Cincinnati Royals draft picks
Guards (basketball)
People from Hollywood, Los Angeles
USC Trojans men's basketball players
Year of birth missing (living people)